Stuart Burge  (15 January 1918 – 24 January 2002) was an English stage and film director, actor and producer.

The son of H. O. Burge, by his marriage to K. M. Haig, Burge was educated at Eagle House School, Sandhurst, and Felsted School, Essex, then trained for an acting career at the Old Vic, 1936–37, and at Oxford Rep, 1937–38. He was back at the Old Vic and appearing in the West End theatre in 1938–39, then during the Second World War of 1939–45 he served in the British Army's Intelligence Corps. After the war he returned to his acting career at the Bristol Old Vic, the Young Vic, and the Commercial Theatre, between 1946 and 1949.

He was a director by 1948. He was responsible for many distinguished productions for both stage and television, including four film adaptations of plays.

He married Josephine Parker an American Actress and had five children: Lucy Burge, Stephen Burge, Nicholas Burge, Matthew Burge and Emma Burge.

Selected filmography

As director 

 1956 : David Copperfield (TV)
 1959 : Back to Back (TV)
 1959 : Julius Caesar (TV)
 1959 : The Third Man (TV)
 1959 : The Waltz of the Toreadors
 1959 : Crime of Passion (TV)
 1960 : There Was a Crooked Man
 1962 : The Ghost Sonata (TV)
 1963 : Uncle Vanya
 1964 : Danger Man (TV)
 1965 : Othello 1966 : Nelson: A Study in Miniature (TV)
 1967 : The Mikado 1967 : Play with a Tiger (TV)
 1970 : Married Alive (TV)
 1970 : Julius Caesar 1974 : Fall of Eagles (TV)
 1975 : Under Western Eyes (TV)
 1976 : Bill Brand (TV)
 1978 : Rumpole of the Bailey (TV)
 1981 : Sons and Lovers (TV)
 1982 : Play for Tomorrow (TV)
 1983 : The Home Front (TV)
 1983 : The Old Men at the Zoo (TV)
 1984 : Much Ado About Nothing (TV)
 1986 : The Importance of Being Earnest (TV)
 1986 : Naming the Names (TV)
 1986 : [[Breaking Up (TV series)|Breaking Up]] (TV)
 1988 : Dinner at Noon (TV)
 1988 : The Rainbow (BBC miniseries)
 1989 : Chinese Whispers (TV)
 1991 : The House of Bernarda Alba (TV)
 1992 : After the Dance (TV)
 1993 : The Wexford Trilogy by Billy Roche: A Handful of Stars, Poor Beast in the Rain and Belfry (BBC TV)
 1994 : Seaforth (TV)

 As actor 

 1953 : The Malta Story (Paolo)

 Stage, technical direction 
 1950 : Twelfth Night'' Old Vic Company/British Council touring production, Teatro Comunale Giuseppe Verdi, Free Territory of Trieste

References

External links 

1918 births
2002 deaths
English male film actors
English film producers
English film directors
People educated at Eagle House School
People educated at Felsted School
Commanders of the Order of the British Empire
British Army personnel of World War II
Intelligence Corps soldiers
20th-century English businesspeople